Chalifert Tunnel is a canal tunnel located in the Canal de Meaux à Chalifert in the Marne river in the French region of Île-de-France (Department of Seine-et-Marne, Arrondissement of Torcy) 

The canal tunnel is located between sluice 14 to Chalifert and sluice 13 to Coupray and has a length of 300 meters. The tunnel is well illuminated and is operated from the Marne.

References

Chalifert
Chalifert
Île-de-France